Tony Iglesias (born 24 December 1972) is a Bolivian former diver. He competed in two events at the 1996 Summer Olympics.

References

External links
 

1972 births
Living people
Bolivian male divers
Olympic divers of Bolivia
Divers at the 1996 Summer Olympics
Place of birth missing (living people)
20th-century Bolivian people
21st-century Bolivian people